The Xenophon Overton Pindall Law Office is listed on the National Register of Historic Places, and is located on the northeast corner of Capitol St. and Kate Adams Ave. in Arkansas City, Arkansas. It belonged to Xenophon Overton Pindall, who practiced in the building before becoming the acting governor of Arkansas in 1907.

See also
National Register of Historic Places listings in Desha County, Arkansas

References

Buildings and structures in Desha County, Arkansas
Office buildings on the National Register of Historic Places in Arkansas
National Register of Historic Places in Desha County, Arkansas
Law offices
Legal history of Arkansas